Thomas Robson (1 February 19361981) was an English footballer who played as a centre half in the Football League for Sunderland and Darlington, and in non-league football for Horden Colliery Welfare. He made his league debut for Sunderland on 28 February 1959 in a 1–0 win at home to Huddersfield Town in the Second Division.

References

1936 births
1981 deaths
Footballers from Sunderland
English footballers
Association football forwards
Sunderland A.F.C. players
Darlington F.C. players
Darlington Town F.C. players
English Football League players